Tuomas Haapala (born 20 April 1979) is a Finnish former footballer who ended his career after 2010.

Haapala has previously played for FC Lahti (2000–03) and MyPa (2004–05) in the Finnish Veikkausliiga. He won the Finnish Cup with MyPa in 2004, and captained the club to the Finnish championship in 2005. After an excellent 2005 season, Haapala was invited for a trial with Manchester City. After two weeks at the club, manager Stuart Pearce decided to offer him a contract to the end of the 2005–06 season. However, Haapala failed to break into the first team, and made only reserve team appearances. After his long try-out in Manchester he signed for Sandefjord Fotball. In August 2007 he joined HJK Helsinki. After three seasons with HJK, Haapala joined Tampere United for the season 2010, which was his last year as a professional football player.

Haapala played his first game for the Finnish national team on 12 October 2005 against Estonia.

Honours
 Finnish championship: 2005, 2009
 Finnish Cup: 2004, 2008

External links
 Profile at HJK.fi
 
 Guardian Football
 

1979 births
Living people
Sportspeople from Lahti
Finnish footballers
Finnish expatriate footballers
Association football midfielders
Veikkausliiga players
FC Lahti players
Myllykosken Pallo −47 players
Manchester City F.C. players
Helsingin Jalkapalloklubi players
Finland international footballers
Sandefjord Fotball players